Comma Press is a publishing house based in Manchester, United Kingdom, that publishes short story anthologies and single-author collections in paperback and eBook formats.

History
Comma Press was founded in 2002 by Ra Page, a former editor at Manchester's City Life magazine. Comma Press is one of Arts Council England's National Portfolio Organisations for the funding period from 2018 to 2022.

Comma is a founding member and coordinator of The Northern Fiction Alliance, a cohort assembled to showcase the output of northern independent presses.

Publications
Comma Press publishes anthologies of short stories, including the BBC National Short Story Award Anthology.

Comma runs the Dinesh Allirajah Prize for Short Fiction in collaboration with the University of Central Lancashire.

Awards
In June 2017 Comma was awarded the inaugural "Northern Publisher of the Year" award at the Northern Soul Awards in Manchester.

References

External links
Comma Press official website
Arts Council England on Comma Press

Book publishing companies of England
Companies based in Manchester